The unofficial flag of the Chatham Islands (Wharekauri in Māori; Rekohu in the indigenous Moriori language) is a blue field with a map of the island in the centre, the Te Whanga Lagoon depicted in white. Behind this device map is a depiction of the rising sun, an allusion to its local name Rekohu, meaning 'rising sun'.

History
The flag was designed in 1989 by Logan Alderson, a former New Zealand police officer.

At the 2005 opening of a new marae on the islands (which included a rare visit by the Prime Minister), the Chathams flag was clearly seen flying from a flagpole over the marae.

See also 
 Flag of New Zealand
 List of New Zealand flags

References

Flags of New Zealand
Flag
Unofficial flags
Flags introduced in 1989